Sacramento Country Day School (SCDS) is an independent, co-educational, college preparatory school serving pre-kindergarten through grade 12 since 1964. SCDS is located in the unincorporated Arden Arcade neighborhood of Sacramento, California, and serves students from all surrounding areas, including Carmichael, Davis, Elk Grove, Placerville, Folsom, El Dorado Hills, and Shingle Springs.

History
Seeking an academically-challenging school for their son, Greg, Dr. Baxter Geeting and his wife, Corinne, formulated the concept for Country Day around their kitchen table. About that time, Dr. Geeting met Herbert Matthews, who was teaching math at a small school in Carmichael, and convinced him to join the discussion.  Soon, the school envisioned by these educators became a reality.

September 14, 1964, the school opened with 12 students in portable buildings at the Unitarian Church on Sierra Blvd.  The following year, the school relocated to its present campus on Latham Drive with 123 students in grades kindergarten through nine.  High School buildings arrived in 1970, the multi-purpose building in 1977, and Lower School classrooms in 1979.  The building boom of the 1980s produced the gymnasium (1982), the Matthews Library (1985), the administration building (1985), and the Lower School library “wing” (1985).  Recent construction includes the Frank Science Center (2005), and the new Lower School building and renovation, completed in August 2008.

As the physical plant and enrollment steadily grew, so did the strength and breadth of the school's educational programs.  Over the decades, SCDS added many Advanced Placement, honors, and elective courses in addition to co-curricular programs such as Mock Trial and Renaissance Day; and field trips such as Sutter's Fort, Marin Headlands, Yosemite, Redwood Glen, and Washington D.C.; and over two dozen interscholastic athletic teams.

Lower School
The Lower School begins with prekindergarten and continues through the fifth grade.

Middle school
SCDS's middle school consists of grades six through eight. Seventh and eighth grades have specialized teachers for each subject, in addition to a home-room teacher and a rotating schedule. Each student is required to take two electives per semester. There are no final exams for middle school students. Most students in the middle school take a foreign language,  either Latin,  Spanish or French.

Each middle school grade spends a week on an educational class trip, including an eighth grade class trip to Washington DC, a seventh grade trip to Yosemite, and a sixth grade trip to Redwood Glen.

High school
The high school consists of roughly 150 students in grades 9 through 12. There are many student clubs and varsity sports teams available to students. Community service is required to graduate. Students must take at least three consecutive years of French, Spanish, or Latin in order to graduate. Arts and drama activities are also available. According to SCDS publications, graduates are regularly accepted to a higher education institution, including universities such as Harvard University, Columbia University, University of California, Los Angeles, Stanford University, Cornell University, Princeton University, and other top-tier schools.

Octagon 
The Octagon is an established school newspaper with a staff of 22 students. The publication has previously won the Pacemaker award, an award equal in prestige to a Pulitzer Prize for high school journalism, and is a finalist for its 08-09 publications. It is a part of the High School National Ad Network and can be viewed online at SCDS Octagon webpage.

Baxterpedia 
Baxterpedia is the Country Day school wiki where any student is welcome to make contributions. Named after Baxter the Owl, it's a site dedicated to recording and sharing information. Students may create pages about any school-appropriate topic they want, and, eventually, the goal is to create a database of information (much like Wikipedia) where new and old students can record and find information regarding the school.

Notable faculty
 David Ancrum (born 1958), basketball player, top scorer in the 1994 Israel Basketball Premier League

References

External links
School Website - www.saccds.org

Educational institutions established in 1964
Preparatory schools in California
High schools in Sacramento, California
Private high schools in California
Private middle schools in California
Private elementary schools in California
1964 establishments in California